Pandalam dynasty (Malayalam:പന്തളം രാജവംശം) a royal dynasty emerged from a branch of Pandya kingdom. which existed in Kerala during the Kollam era. They came to Kerala fearing the assault of the Nayaks of Madurai. In Kerala they were given land and status by Kaipuzha Thampan (Kunjunni Varma Thampan) of Nilambur Kovilakam a landlord who lived in Amanthur Palace at Kaipuzha from Kottayam Kerala. Today Pandalam is part of Pathanamthitta, Kerala, India.

Early history
The Pandya Kingdom of Tamilakam was once attacked by Malik Kafur, the commander-in-chief of Alauddin Khalji of Khalji dynasty. Upon the failure of Pandiya rajas, two branches of this dynasty fled towards west (Kerala) to secure themselves from the attacks. One branch proceeded via the Western Ghats mountainous regions and settled in Poonjar in Kottayam and established the Poonjar kingdom. The other branch (Chembazhannur) wandered through several places ghatsand facing much difficulty finally settled in Pandalam. The fleeing Chembazhannur branch at first settled in Valliyur (near Tirunelveli) and enjoyed a privileged position in the society. Later due to the threats of invasion, the royal family shifted to Tenkasi. Thirumalai Savuri Nayunu Ayyalugaru Naidu, a famed ruler of Madurai wished to see his daughter's marriage with a prince of Chembazhannur family. But upon the rejection of marriage proposal, Nayak became an enemy of Pandiyas. He made huge damages in Tenkasi with his strong Maravappada (army). Knowing that they couldn't continue a peaceful life in Tenkasi, the family moved to a place named  and procured the mountainous regions near Puliyankudi. But Nayak continued to torture the royal family which forced them to proceed towards west (Kerala) via places such as Achankovil, Aryankavu, Kulathupuzha and settled in Konni by c. 79 ME, which was according to the Copper deed issued by the Venad raja. The family constructed a shrine for lord Shiva in Konni (Muringamangalam Sreemahadevar Temple) for their daily worships. This temple is one of the most noted contributions of Chembazhanuur family in Kerala. A number of Mutts, Manas and Koyikkalls were also constructed by the family. The local people fed up with the activities of thieves accepted the family as the ruling class which was named as Chembazhanji kovilakom. Attacks on Travancore by Cholas forced the family to flee Konni and then to settle down in Pandalam which became their permanent capital. A full-fledged kingdom was established by around  ME (1194 CE) by obtaining the land from Kunjunni Varma Thampan (Kaipuzha Thampan) of Amanthur Kovilakam at Kaipuzha and the local ruler and landlord of the region. The Venad ruler also played a great role in the establishment of this kingdom. People enjoyed a peaceful atmosphere and ideal life under the Pandalam rulers. As of the Travancore state manual, Pandalam kingdom kept friendly relations with the rajas of Travancore. Relation between Kaipuzha Thampan and Maharaja of Travancore was extremely cordial. Pandhalam Raja established a good relation with Maharaj of Travancore through Kunjunni Varma Thampan who was the close friend, advisory of Maharaja of Travancore.

During 345 ME, Aadhichavarman a Venad ruler had given a sizable portion of land to this kingdom. Marthanda Varma, the famed Venad ruler and establisher of Travancore kingdom (925 ME) was named for his annexation policies. But on his conquests in Central Travancore, Pandalam was left independent and wasn't annexed to his domain. This was primarily due to cordial relations that Travancore had with Pandalam and of the assistance by the royal family in the Kayamkulam conquest of Varma. Pandalam was forced to give a big amount of Rs.2,20,001 to Travancore government towards the cost of wars after Tippus conquest in Malabar coast during 965 ME. The amount was paid in various installments. During 969 ME, the income from Sabarimala temple was used to pay as installments by a ruler of Pandalam. By 995 ME, the raja of Travancore made an agreement with the Pandalam king assuring that they would support every member of the royal family if they were allowed to collect revenue from Pandalam. Upon the acceptance of this offer, the kingdom of Pandalam was merged with Travancore and a monthly pension was issued for each royal family member. The administrative rights of temples including Sabarimala within the premises of kingdom was transferred to the Travancore government and later to Travancore devaswom board. Before the formation of Pathanamthitta district, Pandalam was a part of the Mavelikkara taluk of Alappuzha district.

Legend about the relationship with Ayyappa

It is believed that the royal family of Pandalam belonged to the Bhargava gotra while other royal families in Kerala were included in the Viswamitra gotra. The kingdom is famed for its kinship with Ayyappa, the son of Harihara (the fusion of Shiva and Vishnu). Raja Rajasekhara, a king of this dynasty during his hunting expedition heard the crying of a baby near the banks of Pamba. The raja found a glorious looking infant wearing a bead in his neck and surrounded by a halo. The childless raja was doubted whether to take the child with him. But Sage Agastya arrived there and cleared his doubts by telling him that the child is a boon from the Gods and advised him to accept him. He was named Manikanta (Mani means bead and Kanta being the neck). He was given proper education in gurukulam Later Rani gave birth to a son but raja considered Manikanta as his elder son and decided to crown him as Yuvaraja of Pandalam.

Manikanta was not willing to take up the throne as he was destined to crush evil. A greedy minister in the court misled the rani of the palace and partake in his scheme against Manikanta. Following the words of the minister, the rani pretended to be affected by a severe stomachache. The bribed royal physician prescribed the milk of Tiger as the only cure for this ache. The king was quite sure that none of the royal servants could complete the mission of obtaining milk from a tiger, but Manikanta agreed to go deep into the forests to fetch it. In the forests, Manikanta would come to fight and vanquish the demoness Mahishi. On the very next day, he arrived at the palace riding a tiger followed by a group of cubs. Realizing that Manikanta was not an ordinary being, the members of the palace began praising him by calling him Ayyane and Appane, from which the name "Ayyappa" originated. As his mission of slaying the demoness Mahishi was fulfilled, Manikanta determined that he should leave the palace, not before instructing the raja to construct a shrine at Sabarimala where he would be presiding to bless thousands of devotees. He blessed everyone who assembled there once this was done and vanished forever.

The above verses show the relationship of Lord Ayyappa with the Pandiya kingdom. He is often depicted as the Thilak (a mark on the forehead) of the Pandiya vamsa and the beloved deity of Kerala nadu.

The Palace complex
Pandalam palace 

() is a royal palace of Pandalam located on the banks of Achankovil river was the residence of royal family members. The architectural mixtures of both Pandyas and Keralites can be witnessed in any corner of the palace. Mud, bamboo, stone and wood are the mostly used construction components in the old structures. It was in this palace that lord Ayyappa spent his childhood. In course of time, many parts of the palace were taken away by minor conflagrations and floods. But quite a few structures like Valiyakoikkal temple, Kaipuzha temple and Thevarappura remains still which depicts the ancient history and archaeological importance.

Valiyakoikkal temple

The temple situated on the banks of Achankovil river was the family temple of Pandalam kingdom, built in the traditional architectural styles of Kerala. It was built by Rajasekhara raja after returning from Sabarimala for daily worships of Ayyappa. The shrine is placed within the palace premises. A Salagramam (sacred stone) is installed here instead of an idol. The holy Thiruvabharanam procession to Sabarimala begins from this temple every year on 28th of dhanu before the   Makaravilakku festival hosted in the month of Makaram.

Kaipuzha temple
There are mainly two shrine in this complex, one for Shiva under the palace administration other for Krishna managed by Travancore devaswom board. The Navagraha (nine holy planets) sculptures are portrayed in the shrine of Krishna. Once the idol of Narasimha Murthy was installed in the temple which was very powerful. But due to the unfortunate incidents in the palace, the idol was replaced by the Santhana gopalam pratishta as per the instructions of astrologers and priests.

Thevarappuras (prayer rooms)

The prayer rooms or Thevarappuras of both Vadakkekottaram and Nalukettu palaces structured elegantly in wood are still in unblemished condition which keeps the idols of 28 gods and goddess for worshipping. The Pandiyan relation of Pandalam kingdom can easily be noticed from the presence of Minakshi amman idol.

Srampical palace
The palace is placed in the north of Valiyakoikkal temple. The Thiruvabharanam (sacred ornaments) of lord Ayyappa are kept here. Pilgrims have the opportunity to worship the ornaments and to view the holy palanquin at times of Mandala - Makaravilakku period. These ornaments are taken out on the morning of 28th Dhanu then moved to the temple and later to Sabarimala temple in a holy procession.

Puthenkoikkal
This building is situated near a pond. The pond was once meant for bathing purposes of ladies in the palace. The raja on his way to Sabarimala with the sacred ornaments used to halt at this palace to receive the Vibhuti and blessings of Valiya thamburatti (senior most female member).

Customs and beliefs in the palace
The palace itself keeps a number of varied customs and beliefs as sacred. The royal family had the privileges to perform various ritual practices at Valiyakoikkal and Sabarimala temples. Devotees often visits the raja to obtain the blessings in the form of Vibhuti (sacred ash).

Some important customs

 The representative of the Valiya Thampuran has the privilege of being the last to pray at the Sabarimala shrine on Makaravilakku day
 The male children (before upanayana) and female members (age 10–50) are not allowed to undertake the holy pilgrimage.
 The royal members need not carry the Irumudikettu (travel kit) along with them on the Sabarimala pilgrimage.
 The Valiyakoikkal temple will be closed for 12 days upon the demise of any family member of the Palace.

Notable personalities
The royal family of Pandalam has renowned artists, scholars and men of letters. 
 Pandalam Kerala Varma is a writer. He wrote many narrative poems, translations, children's poetry and two mahakavyas. He served as the chief editor of "Kavana Kaumudi", the first Malayalam periodical.
 V.S. Valiathan (Vattaparambil Sankaran Valiathan) was born in the royal family of Pandalam as the son of Revathinal Ravi Varam Raja and Thottathil madhavi Amma. He is one of the noted artists from Kerala who followed the styles of Raja Ravi Varma.

See also

 Poonjar dynasty
 Ayyappa
 Pandalam Palace
 Pandalam Kerala Varma
 Valiyakoikkal temple
 Pandya dynasty
 History of Kerala
 Thiruvabharanam
 Aranmula palace
 Malayalam calendar

References

External links
 Information portal about Pandalam
 Official website of Pandalam palace
 Royal Family Of Pandalam

Dynasties of India
Kingdoms of Kerala